The 2007 Russian football season, saw CSKA Moscow competed in the Russian Premier League, Russian Super Cup, Russian Cup, the UEFA Cup and the UEFA Champions League.
CSKA were defending Premier League champions but could not successfully defend it, finishing 3rd. They also failed to defend their 2005/06 Cup crown, getting knocked out at the Sixth Round stage by Krylia Sovetov during the 2006/07 Cup. They did however win all their games from the 2007/08 cup that were played in 2007, progressing to the semi-finals by the end of the 2007 season. CSKA did however retain their Russian Super Cup. After being eliminated to the UEFA Cup during the 2006/07 European campaign, they were knocked out by Maccabi Haifa at the Round of 32. CSKA qualified directly for the group stage of the 2007–08 UEFA Champions League, however they did not make it out of the group, after being drawn with Inter Milan, Fenerbahçe and PSV Eindhoven, finishing bottom of the group with 1 point.

Squad

Out on loan

Transfers

Winter

In:

 
 
 

Out:

Summer

In:

 
 

Out:

Competitions

UEFA Cup

Knockout stage

Russian Super Cup

Russian Premier League

Results by round

Results

League table

Russian Cup

2006-07

2007-08

Round 16 took place during the 2008 season.

UEFA Champions League

Group stage

Statistics

Appearances and goals

|-
|colspan="14"|Players that left CSKA Moscow on loan during the season:
|-
|colspan="14"|Players who appeared for CSKA Moscow that left during the season:
|}

Goal Scorers

Disciplinary Record

References

2007
CSKA Moscow